Carla Vistarini (8 July 1948) is an Italian lyricist, writer, playwright and scriptwriter.

Born in Rome, she has written songs for various major Italian artists such as Mina, Ornella Vanoni, Mia Martini, Patty Pravo, Riccardo Fogli, Peppino di Capri, Loretta Goggi, Raffaella Carrà, Renato Zero.

She has been artistic director of Sanremo Music Festival 1997 in trio with Giorgio Moroder and Pino Donaggio.

Won David di Donatello Award 1995 for best scriptwriting for Nemici d'infanzia,.

Author of Pavarotti and Friends International Rai Uno from 1991 until 1998.

Her novel Se ho paura prendimi per mano (If I'm scared take my hand) was published in 2014.

Novel "Se ricordi il mio nome" released January 2018.

"Le ragioni della scrittura" (The reasons of writing)

Songs written by Carla Vistarini

References

External links

 Carla Vistarini on Discogs

Writers from Rome
1948 births
Italian lyricists
Italian screenwriters
Italian television writers
Italian women writers
David di Donatello winners
Living people
Women television writers